Bogneča Vas is a village in the Municipality of Mokronog-Trebelno in southeastern Slovenia. The area is part of the traditional region of Lower Carniola. The municipality is now included in the Southeast Slovenia Statistical Region.

Name
Bogneča Vas was attested in written sources as Pogendorff in 1395/96 and Pogendorf in 1436.

References

External links
Bogneca Vas on Geopedia

Populated places in the Municipality of Mokronog-Trebelno